Celin Bizet Ildhusøy (born 24 October 2001) is a Norwegian professional footballer who plays as a forward for Women's Super League club Tottenham Hotspur and the Norway national team.

Career
Hailing from Frogner i Sørum, Bizet made her senior debut for Skedsmo on the third tier in 2016. Ahead of the 2017 season she transferred to Vålerenga, where she made her Toppserien debut against Avaldsnes in April 2017. She scored her first goal in May 2018 against Grand Bodø. In 2019 she was briefly on loan at Grei. With Vålerenga she was a losing cup finalist in 2017 and 2019, before winning the double in 2020.

After a good 2020 season, there were several speculations about a transfer abroad, but Bizet penned a new contract with Vålerenga in January 2021. She was also called up to national team training camp in the autumn of 2020.

In July 2021, Bizet signed for Paris Saint-Germain in the top flight of French football.

On 10 August 2022, Paris Saint-Germain transferred Bizet to Tottenham Hotspur in the top flight of English football, where she signed a contract until 2025.

Personal life
Bizet is the daughter of a former Norwegian footballer, Kjell Gunnar Ildhusøy and a Cuban mother.

Career statistics

International

Scores and results list Norway's goal tally first, score column indicates score after each Bizet goal.

Honours
Vålerenga
 Toppserien: 2020
 Norwegian Women's Cup: 2020

Paris Saint-Germain
 Coupe de France féminine: 2021–22

References

2001 births
Living people
People from Sørum
Norwegian people of Cuban descent
Norwegian women's footballers
Norway women's youth international footballers
Vålerenga Fotball Damer players
Toppserien players
Women's association football forwards
Paris Saint-Germain Féminine players
Division 1 Féminine players
Tottenham Hotspur F.C. Women players
Women's Super League players
Norway women's international footballers
Norwegian expatriate women's footballers
Norwegian expatriate sportspeople in France
Norwegian expatriate sportspeople in England
Expatriate women's footballers in France
Expatriate women's footballers in England
Sportspeople from Viken (county)
UEFA Women's Euro 2022 players